Haik may refer to:

Places
Haik, Iran, a village in Yazd Province, Iran
Hayq, Ethiopia, a town in northern Ethiopia

People

Given name / Mononym
Hayk, legendary founder of Armenia
Haik Hovsepian Mehr (1945–1994), Iranian martyr
Haik M. Martirosyan (born 2000), Armenian chess player
Haik Nikogosian (born 1955), Armenian physician, politician and a public health expert

Surname
Jacques Haïk (1893–1950), French film producer
Katherine Haik, Miss Teen USA 2015
Mac Haik, American football player, wide receiver
Mohammad Al-Haik, Saudi Arabian footballer 
Richard T. Haik (born 1950), American U.S. District Judge
Suzanne Haïk-Vantoura (1912–2000),  was an organist, music teacher, composer and music theorist.
Ted Haik (born 1945), American attorney and politician

Others
Haik (garment), a type of veil used in Algeria
Proper name of WASP-34b

See also
Haig (disambiguation)
Hayek